Dreaming the Rose (San o ruži) is a 1986 Croatian film directed by Zoran Tadić, based on a screenplay by Pavao Pavličić.

External links
 
 

1986 films
1980s Croatian-language films
Yugoslav crime drama films
Croatian crime drama films
Films set in Zagreb
1986 crime drama films